The 1979 BMW M1 Procar Championship was the inaugural season of the BMW M1 Procar Championship. The series ran as a support category to the European rounds of the 1979 Formula One season.

Teams and drivers

Calendar and results

Championship standings

Points system

Standings

References

BMW Procar